The Order of battle of the East African campaign shows the ground forces of both sides in East Africa on the date that the Italians declared war on Britain and France, 10 June 1940 and for the British and Commonwealth forces involved in the 1941 offensive.

Comando Forze Armate dell'Africa Orientale Italiana 

Commander-in-Chief, Italian East African Armed Forces Command, Amedeo, 3rd Duke of Aosta

Northern Sector 
 Northern Sector, in Asmara – Lieutenant-General Luigi Frusci

Eritrea Troops Command 
 Eritrea Troops Command, in Asmara – Major-General Vincenzo Tessitore
 V Colonial Brigade, in Kerora – Brigadier-General Angelo Bergonzi
 XCVII Colonial Battalion
 CV Colonial Battalion
 CVI Colonial Battalion
 V Colonial Artillery Group (65/17 field guns)
 5th Colonial Cavalry Squadron
 5th Mixed Colonial Engineer Company
 5th Colonial Field Hospital
 5th Colonial Supply Column
 VIII Colonial Brigade, in Teseney – Colonel Antonio Rizzo
 CI Colonial Battalion
 CII Colonial Battalion
 VIII Colonial Artillery Group (65/17 field guns)
 8th Colonial Cavalry Squadron
 8th Mixed Colonial Engineer Company
 8th Colonial Field Hospital
 8th Colonial Supply Column
 XII Colonial Brigade, in Sebderat – Colonel Ugo Tabellini
 XXXV Colonial Battalion
 XXXVI Colonial Battalion
 XLIII Colonial Battalion
 XII Colonial Artillery Group (65/17 field guns)
 12th Colonial Cavalry Squadron
 12th Mixed Colonial Engineer Company
 12th Colonial Field Hospital
 12th Colonial Supply Column
 2nd CC.NN. Legion "Ivo Oliveti", in Asmara
 XIII CC.NN. Battalion
 XIV CC.NN. Battalion
 XVI CC.NN. Battalion
 CXVI CC.NN. Battalion
 1 × Colonial Artillery Group (77/28 field guns)
 1 × CC.NN. Anti-aircraft Group (75/27 CK and Model 35 anti-aircraft guns)
 German Auto-transported Company (German volunteers)
 Colonial Unit "Cheren" (Irregular forces)
 Armoured Car Section "Eritrea" (1ZM armoured cars)

Amhara Troops Command 
 Amhara Troops Command, in Gondar – Major-General Agostino Martini
 III Colonial Brigade, in Debre Marqos – Colonel Saverio Maraventano
 XI Colonial Battalion
 XXIII Colonial Battalion
 XXX Colonial Battalion
 LXX Colonial Battalion
 III Colonial Artillery Group (65/17 field guns)
 3rd Colonial Cavalry Squadron
 3rd Mixed Colonial Engineer Company
 3rd Colonial Field Hospital
 3rd Colonial Supply Column
 IV Colonial Brigade, in Gondar – Colonel Livio Bonelli
 XIV Colonial Battalion
 XXV Colonial Battalion
 XXVII Colonial Battalion
 XXIX Colonial Battalion
 IV Colonial Artillery Group (65/17 field guns)
 4th Colonial Cavalry Squadron
 4th Mixed Colonial Engineer Company
 4th Colonial Field Hospital
 4th Colonial Supply Column
 XIX Colonial Brigade, in Injibara – Colonel Enrico Durante
 XXI Colonial Battalion
 LXV Colonial Battalion
 LXXII Colonial Battalion
 LXXXVI Colonial Battalion
 XIX Colonial Artillery Group (65/17 field guns)
 19th Colonial Cavalry Squadron
 19th Mixed Colonial Engineer Company
 19th Colonial Field Hospital
 19th Colonial Supply Column
 XXI Colonial Brigade, in Debre Tabor – Colonel Ignazio Angelini
 LXXVII Colonial Battalion
 LXXVIII Colonial Battalion
 LXXIX Colonial Battalion
 LXXX Colonial Battalion
 XXI Colonial Artillery Group (65/17 field guns)
 21st Colonial Cavalry Squadron
 21st Mixed Colonial Engineer Company
 21st Colonial Field Hospital
 21st Colonial Supply Column
 XXII Colonial Brigade, in Dangla – Colonel Adriano Torelli
 LXVII Colonial Battalion
 LXVIII Colonial Battalion
 LXIX Colonial Battalion
 LXXXI Colonial Battalion
 XXII Colonial Artillery Group (65/17 field guns)
 22nd Colonial Cavalry Squadron
 22nd Mixed Colonial Engineer Company
 22nd Colonial Field Hospital
 22nd Colonial Supply Column
 3rd CC.NN. Legion "Reginaldo Giuliani", in Gondar
 CXXXI CC.NN. Battalion
 CXLI CC.NN. Battalion
 CXLVI CC.NN. Battalion
 CLI CC.NN. Battalion
 7th CC.NN. Legion "F. Battisti", in Dessie
 CLXV CC.NN. Battalion
 CCXL CC.NN. Battalion
 DCXXX CC.NN. Battalion
 DCXXXV CC.NN. Battalion
 III Colonial Battalion
 CVIII Colonial Battalion
 CXIV Colonial Battalion
 1 × CC.NN. Anti-aircraft Group (75/27 CK and Model 35 anti-aircraft guns)
 Colonial Unit "Amhara" (Irregular forces)
 I Colonial Frontier Units Group
 II Colonial Frontier Units Group
 Armoured Car Section "Amhara" (1ZM armoured cars)

Southern Sector 
 Southern Sector, in Jimma – General Pietro Gazzera (doubles as commander of the Galla and Sidama Troops Command)

Galla and Sidama Troops Command 
 Galla and Sidama Troops Command, in Jimma – General Pietro Gazzera
 I Colonial Brigade, in Magi – Colonel Guido Pialorsi
 I Colonial Battalion
 VI Colonial Battalion
 VIII Colonial Battalion
 XVIII Colonial Battalion
 III Colonial Artillery Group (75/13 howitzers)
 1st Colonial Cavalry Squadron
 1st Mixed Colonial Engineer Company
 1st Colonial Field Hospital
 1st Colonial Supply Column
 IX Colonial Brigade, in Yabelo – Colonel Flaminio Orrigo
 II Colonial Battalion
 XVII Colonial Battalion
 LIX Colonial Battalion
 LX Colonial Battalion
 IX Colonial Artillery Group (65/17 field guns)
 9th Colonial Cavalry Squadron
 9th Mixed Colonial Engineer Company
 9th Colonial Field Hospital
 9th Colonial Supply Column
 X Colonial Brigade, in Gimbi – Colonel Giuseppe Cloza
 XXVIII Colonial Battalion
 LV Colonial Battalion
 CLXXXI Colonial Battalion
 CLXXXVII Colonial Battalion
 X Colonial Artillery Group (65/17 field guns)
 10th Colonial Cavalry Squadron
 10th Mixed Colonial Engineer Company
 10th Colonial Field Hospital
 10th Colonial Supply Column
 XVIII Colonial Brigade, in Jimma – Colonel Bartolemeo Minola
 XVI Colonial Battalion
 LXI Colonial Battalion
 CLXXXII Colonial Battalion
 CLXXXIII Colonial Battalion
 XVIII Colonial Artillery Group (65/17 field guns)
 18th Colonial Cavalry Squadron
 18th Mixed Colonial Engineer Company
 18th Colonial Field Hospital
 18th Colonial Supply Column
 XXV Colonial Brigade, in Dolo – Lieutenant-Colonel Giorgio Rolandi
 VII Colonial Battalion
 XXVIII Colonial Battalion
 LIV Colonial Battalion
 XXV Colonial Artillery Group (65/17 field guns)
 25th Colonial Cavalry Squadron
 25th Mixed Colonial Engineer Company
 25th Colonial Field Hospital
 25th Colonial Supply Column
 6th CC.NN. Legion "Luigi Valcarenghi", in Jimma
 DCCXXXI CC.NN. Battalion
 DCCXLV CC.NN. Battalion
 VI Colonial Cavalry Squadrons Group
 XI Colonial Cavalry Squadrons Group
 1 × CC.NN. Anti-aircraft Group (75/27 CK and Model 35 anti-aircraft guns)
 III Colonial Frontier Units Group
 IV Colonial Frontier Units Group
 V Colonial Frontier Units Group
 Colonial Unit "Gallabi" (Irregular forces)
 Colonial Unit "Uollame" (Irregular forces)
 Colonial Unit "Uolkitti" (Irregular forces)
 Armoured Car Section "Galla-Sidama" (1ZM armoured cars)

Eastern Sector 
 Eastern Sector, in Addis Ababa – Lieutenant-General Guglielmo Nasi

Harar Troops Command 
 Harar Troops Command, in Harar – Major-General Carlo De Simone
 XIII Colonial Brigade, in Dire Dawa – Brigadier-General Cesare Nam
 XX Colonial Battalion
 XXXIX Colonial Battalion
 XLVIII Colonial Battalion
 XIII Colonial Artillery Group (65/17 field guns)
 13th Colonial Cavalry Squadron
 13th Mixed Colonial Engineer Company
 13th Colonial Field Hospital
 13th Colonial Supply Column
 XIV Colonial Brigade, in Harar – Colonel Siliprandi
 XXXVII Colonial Battalion
 LXIV Colonial Battalion
 LXXXIII Colonial Battalion
 XIV Colonial Artillery Group (65/17 field guns)
 14th Colonial Cavalry Squadron
 14th Mixed Colonial Engineer Company
 14th Colonial Field Hospital
 14th Colonial Supply Column
 XV Colonial Brigade, in Jijiga – Major Romano
 XXXVIII Colonial Battalion
 XL Colonial Battalion
 XLIX Colonial Battalion
 CXLII Colonial Battalion
 XV Colonial Artillery Group (65/17 field guns)
 15th Colonial Cavalry Squadron
 15th Mixed Colonial Engineer Company
 15th Colonial Field Hospital
 15th Colonial Supply Column
 XVII Colonial Brigade, in Lassar – Colonel Focanti
 XLII Colonial Battalion
 LVIII Colonial Battalion
 LXVI Colonial Battalion
 XVII Colonial Artillery Group (65/17 field guns)
 17th Colonial Cavalry Squadron
 17th Mixed Colonial Engineer Company
 17th Colonial Field Hospital
 17th Colonial Supply Column
 4th CC.NN. Legion "Filippo Corridoni", in Harar
 CLXIV CC.NN. Battalion
 CLXVI CC.NN. Battalion
 DII CC.NN. Battalion
 DIV CC.NN. Battalion
 I Arab-Somali Battalion
 LXV Machine Gun Battalion (detached from the 65th Infantry Division "Granatieri di Savoia")
 XIV Colonial Cavalry Squadrons Group
 1x Colonial Artillery Group (77/28 field guns)
 1x CC.NN. Anti-aircraft Group (75/27 CK and Model 35 anti-aircraft guns)
 VI Dubat Units Group
 Colonial Unit "Fanelli" (Irregular forces)
 Colonial Unit "Svianò" (Irregular forces)
 Colonial Unit "Asellè" (Irregular forces)
 Colonial Unit "Alefà" (Irregular forces)
 1st Armoured Car Squadron (Fiat 611 armoured cars)
 Armoured Car Section "Harar" (1ZM armoured cars)

Scioa Troops Command 
 Scioa Troops Command, in Addis Ababa – Major-General Ettore Scala
 XX Colonial Brigade, in Baidoa – Colonel Giuseppe Azzolini
 XL Colonial Battalion
 LXXIV Colonial Battalion
 LXXV Colonial Battalion
 LXXVI Colonial Battalion
 XX Colonial Artillery Group (65/17 field guns)
 20th Colonial Cavalry Squadron
 20th Mixed Colonial Engineer Company
 20th Colonial Field Hospital
 20th Colonial Supply Column
 XXIII Colonial Brigade, in Waliso – Lieutenant-Colonel Casabassa
 LXXXVIII Colonial Battalion
 LXXXIX Colonial Battalion
 XC Colonial Battalion
 XXIII Colonial Artillery Group (65/17 field guns)
 23rd Colonial Cavalry Squadron
 23rd Mixed Colonial Engineer Company
 23rd Colonial Field Hospital
 23rd Colonial Supply Column
 1st CC.NN. Legion "Arnaldo Mussolini", in Addis Ababa
 II CC.NN. Battalion
 IV CC.NN. Battalion
 V CC.NN. Battalion
 XI CC.NN. Battalion
 Addis Ababa Artillery Command, in Addis Ababa
 2 × CC.NN. Anti-aircraft groups (75/46 anti-aircraft guns)
 1 × Heavy Field Artillery Battery (104/32 howitzers)
 1 × Heavy Field Artillery Battery (149/13 howitzers)
 1 × Position Artillery Battery (120/45 naval guns in fixed positions)
 7 × Position Artillery batteries (120/25 field guns in fixed positions)
 I Colonial Cavalry Squadrons Group
 II Colonial Cavalry Squadrons Group
 III Colonial Cavalry Squadrons Group
 V Colonial Cavalry Squadrons Group
 XV Colonial Cavalry Squadrons Group
 XL Machine Gun Battalion (detached from the 40th Infantry Division "Cacciatori d'Africa")
 Colonial Units Group "Altopiano" (Irregular forces)
 Colonial Units Group "Rolle" (Irregular forces)
 Colonial Units Group "Scioa" (Irregular forces)
 Colonial Units Group "Uollo Ambassel" (Irregular forces)
 Colonial Unit "Auasc" (Irregular forces)
 Colonial Unit "Bolè" (Irregular forces)
 Colonial Unit "Buriè" (Irregular forces)
 Colonial Unit "Doduò" (Irregular forces)
 Colonial Unit "Moggiò" (Irregular forces)
 3 × Anti-tank companies (47/32 anti-tank guns)
 Armoured Car Section "Scioa" (1ZM armoured cars)

Autonomous Giuba Sector 
 Autonomous Giuba Sector, in Mogadishu – Major-General Gustavo Pesenti
 XCI Colonial Brigade, in Jilib – Colonel Italo Carnevali
 LXXV Colonial Battalion
 CXCIV Colonial Battalion
 CXCVI Colonial Battalion
 XCI Colonial Artillery Group (70/15 field guns)
 91st Colonial Cavalry Squadron
 91st Mixed Colonial Engineer Company
 91st Colonial Field Hospital
 91st Colonial Supply Column
 XCII Colonial Brigade, in Barawa – Colonel Giaume
 LXXIV Colonial Battalion
 CXCI Colonial Battalion
 CXCII Colonial Battalion
 XCII Colonial Artillery Group (70/15 field guns)
 92nd Colonial Cavalry Squadron
 92nd Mixed Colonial Engineer Company
 92nd Colonial Field Hospital
 92nd Colonial Supply Column
 5th CC.NN. Legion "Luigi Razza", in Mogadishu
 DV CC.NN. Battalion
 DVI CC.NN. Battalion
 DLXXXV CC.NN. Battalion
 DCXXXI CC.NN. Battalion
 IV Colonial Coastal Battalion
 V Colonial Coastal Battalion
 CI Colonial Artillery Group (70/15 field guns)
 Dubat Grouping
 I Dubat Units Group
 II Dubat Units Group
 III Dubat Units Group
 IV Dubat Units Group
 V Dubat Units Group
 VI Colonial Frontier Units Group
 Colonial Units Group "Desciech Uama" (Irregular forces)
 Armoured Car Section "Giuba" (1ZM armoured cars)

General Reserve 
 General Reserve, in Addis Ababa – Lieutenant-General Claudio Trezzani, Chief of Staff of the Italian East African Armed Forces Command
 IV Motorized Artillery Group (77/28 field guns)
 XXV Motorized Artillery Group (77/28 field guns)
 XXVI Motorized Artillery Group (77/28 field guns)
 XXXI Motorized Artillery Group (77/28 field guns)
 XXXII Motorized Artillery Group (77/28 field guns)
 CII Motorized Artillery Group (105/28 howitzers)
 CIII Motorized Artillery Group (105/28 howitzers)
 CIV Motorized Artillery Group (105/28 howitzers)
 CV Motorized Artillery Group (105/28 howitzers)
 CVI Motorized Artillery Group (105/28 howitzers)
 1st Special Tank Company "L", in Addis Ababa (L3/35 tankettes)
 2nd Special Tank Company "M", in Addis Ababa (M11/39 tanks)

40th Infantry Division "Cacciatori d'Africa" 
  40th Infantry Division "Cacciatori d'Africa", in Addis Ababa – Major-General Giovanni Varda
 210th Infantry Regiment "Bisagno"
 Command Company
 2 × Fusiliers battalions
 211th Infantry Regiment "Pescara"
 Command Company
 2 × Fusiliers battalions
 III CC.NN. Battalion
 XV CC.NN. Battalion
 I African Motorized Artillery Group (65/17 field guns)
 XVIII Mixed African Engineer Battalion
 Divisional Services

65th Infantry Division "Granatieri di Savoia" 
  65th Infantry Division "Granatieri di Savoia", in Addis Ababa – Major-General Amedeo Liberati
 10th Grenadier Regiment
 Command Company
 2 × Grenadier battalions
 Alpini Battalion "Uork Amba"
 Support Weapons Company (65/17 field guns)
 Mortar Company (81mm Mod. 35 mortars)
 11th Granatieri Regiment
 Command Company
 2 × Grenadier battalions
 African Bersaglieri Battalion
 Support Weapons Company (65/17 field guns)
 Mortar Company (81mm Mod. 35 mortars)
 11th East African CC.NN. Legion
 I CC.NN. Battalion
 XII CC.NN. Battalion
 60th Artillery Regiment "Granatieri di Savoia" (Motorized)
 Command Unit
 I Group (65/17 field guns)
 II Group (65/17 field guns)
 III Group (65/17 field guns)
 IV Group (100/17 howitzers)
 V Group (105/28 howitzers)
 Ammunition and Supply Unit
 Cavalry Squadrons Group "Cavalieri di Neghelli" ("Knights of Neghelli")
 2 × Cavalry squadrons
 1 × Tank Squadron (L3/33 tankettes)
 60th Signal Engineers Company
 60th Engineer Company
 Medical Section
 Supply Section
 Carabinieri Section

Autonomous brigades 
 II Colonial Brigade, in Ankober – Colonel Orlando Lorenzini
 IV Colonial Battalion
 V Colonial Battalion
 IX Colonial Battalion
 X Colonial Battalion
 II Colonial Artillery Group (65/17 field guns)
 2nd Colonial Cavalry Squadron
 2nd Mixed Colonial Engineer Company
 2nd Colonial Field Hospital
 2nd Colonial Supply Column
 VI Colonial Brigade, in Dessie – Colonel Agostino Magrini
 XIX Colonial Battalion
 XXIV Colonial Battalion
 XXXI Colonial Battalion
 XXXIV Colonial Battalion
 VI Colonial Artillery Group (65/17 field guns)
 6th Colonial Cavalry Squadron
 6th Mixed Colonial Engineer Company
 6th Colonial Field Hospital
 6th Colonial Supply Column
 VII Colonial Brigade, in Ambo – Colonel Tiburzio Rean
 XIII Colonial Battalion
 XV Colonial Battalion
 XLV Colonial Battalion
 VII Colonial Artillery Group (65/17 field guns)
 7th Colonial Cavalry Squadron
 7th Mixed Colonial Engineer Company
 7th Colonial Field Hospital
 7th Colonial Supply Column
 XI Colonial Brigade, in Fiche – Colonel Francesco Prina
 LI Colonial Battalion
 LII Colonial Battalion
 LVI Colonial Battalion
 XI Colonial Artillery Group (65/17 field guns)
 11th Colonial Cavalry Squadron
 11th Mixed Colonial Engineer Company
 11th Colonial Field Hospital
 11th Colonial Supply Column
 XVI Colonial Brigade, in Teseney – Colonel Manlio Manetti
 XXII Colonial Battalion
 XXIII Colonial Battalion
 XLVII Colonial Battalion
 LIII Colonial Battalion
 XVI Colonial Artillery Group (65/17 field guns)
 16th Colonial Cavalry Squadron
 16th Mixed Colonial Engineer Company
 16th Colonial Field Hospital
 16th Colonial Supply Column
 XLI Colonial Brigade, in Adigrat – Brigadier-General Ugo Fongoli
 XCVIII Colonial Battalion
 XCIX Colonial Battalion
 CXXXI Colonial Battalion
 CXXXII Colonial Battalion
 XLI Colonial Artillery Group (65/17 field guns)
 41st Colonial Cavalry Squadron
 41st Mixed Colonial Engineer Company
 41st Colonial Field Hospital
 41st Colonial Supply Column
 LXXXV Colonial Brigade, in Shashamane – Colonel Lannuti
 CLXXXIII Colonial Battalion
 CLXXXIV Colonial Battalion
 CLXXXV Colonial Battalion
 CLXXXVI Colonial Battalion
 LXXXV Colonial Artillery Group (65/17 field guns)
 85th Colonial Cavalry Squadron
 85th Mixed Colonial Engineer Company
 85th Colonial Field Hospital
 85th Colonial Supply Column

Colonial divisions 
Over the course of the war the Italians combined some of the colonial brigades in divisions, however the sources as to which brigades were attached to which division and for how long are contradictory. Below follows the division listing as given by the Italian wikipedia at :it:Divisioni del Regio Esercito nella seconda guerra mondiale#Divisioni coloniali - Africa Orientale Italiana:

May 1941 

 Supreme Commander FF AA AOI: Lieutenant-General Pietro Gazzera
Total 127,000 men

 Southern Sector - Lieutenant-General Pietro Gazzera (80,000 men)
 Left Zone, in Omo - Major-General Antonio Tissi
 21st Colonial Division - Brigadier-General Ettore Caffaratti
 24th Colonial Division - Brigadier-General Emanuele Beraudo di Pralormo
 25th Colonial Division - Brigadier-General Amedeo Liberati
 101st Colonial Division - Brigadier-General Alfredo Baccari
 Central Zone - Major-General Ettore Scala
 22nd Colonial Division - Brigadier-General Guido Pialorsi
 Dabus-Didessa Zone - Major-General Carlo De Simone
 Western Sector - Lieutenant-General Guglielmo Nasi (17,000 Italian & 23,000 colonial troops)
 Gondar Fortified Place - Lieutenant-General Guglielmo Nasi (30,000 men)
 Uolchefit Fortress - Lieutenant-Colonel Mario Gonella (4,000 men)
 Debra Tabor Fortress - Colonel Ignazio Angelini (6,000 men)
 Danaclia Sector - Brigadier-General Pietro Piacentini (2,400 Italian and 3,300 colonial troops)
 Tio-Assab-Rahesta Garrison - Frigate-Capitan Guglielmo Bolla (800 men)
 Sardo-Dobi Presidio - Colonel Umberto Raugei (Royal Italian Navy, 1,300 men)
 Elidar-Manda Sector - Brigadier-General Pietro Piacentini (Royal Italian Air Force, 100 pilots)
 Batie Sector - Brigadier-General Luigi Frusci (2,500 Italian and 3,000 colonial troops)
 Isolated units:
 Migiurtina Zone - Colonel R. de Maria
 Arussi Zone - Brigadier-General Alborghetti

, June 1940

 Pietro Pinna Parpaglia

Northern Sector Command 
The Northern Sector Command was based in Asmara.

 26th Group, at Gondar
 11th Squadron (6 × Ca.133)
 13th Squadron (6 × Ca.133, at Bahar Dar, converting to SM.81)
 27th Group, at Dessie
 18th Squadron (6 × Ca.133)
 52nd Squadron (6 × Ca.133)
 118th Squadron (6 × Ca.133, converting to SM. 81)
 28th Group, at Zula and Gura in 1940; Sciasciamanna in 1941
 10th Squadron (6 × SM.81)
 19th Squadron (6 × SM.81)
 29th Group, at Mille, Dessie, Sciasciamanna, Yavello in 1940; Bardera in 1941
 62nd Squadron (6 × SM.81)
 63rd Squadron (6 × SM.81)
 412th Squadron (9 × CR.42 - 4 at Massawa, 5 at Gura)
 413th Squadron (9 × CR.42 at Assab)
 414th Squadron (6 × CR.42 at Gura)
 Gasbarini Group, at Agordat
 41st Squadron (6 × Ca.133)
 Northern Sector General Staff Squadron (6 × Ca.133)

Western Sector Command 
The Western Sector Command was based in Addis Ababa. The Command was formed on 1 August 1940 and disbanded on 19 August 1941.

 Collati
 4th Terrestrial Bomber Group (Lieutenant-Colonel Branca)
 14th Squadron (6 × SM.81, at Diredawa)
 15th Squadron (6 × SM.81, at Diredawa)
 44th Group
 6th Squadron (6 × SM.79, at Diredawa)
 7th Squadron (6 × SM.79, at Diredawa)
 49th Group
 61st Squadron (6 × Ca.133, at Jimma)
 64th Squadron (6 × Ca.133, at Jimma)
 65th Squadron (6 × Ca.133, at Neghelli)
 66th Squadron (3 × Ca.133, at Yavello)
 110th Squadron (9 × Ro.37, at Diredawa)
 410th Squadron (9 × CR.32, at Diredawa)
 411th Squadron (9 × CR.32, at Addis Ababa)
 Southern Sector General Staff Squadron

Southern Sector Command 
The Southern Sector Command was based in Mogadishu.(All data from Nafziger 2012, unless indicated; original source: National Archives Microcopy No. T-821, Roll 144, American Historical Association Committee for the Study of War Documents, Washington, DC. 1960.)

 25th Terrestrial Bomber Group (Major Santagata)
 8th Squadron (6 × Ca.133, at Gobwen)
 9th Squadron (6 × Ca.133, at Lugh Ferrandi)
 Southern Sector General Staff Squadron (7 × Ca.133, at Mogadishu)
 1st Transport Group
 2nd Transport Group
 CRA Addis Ababa
 4th Principal Magazine
 6th M.S.A. Magazine
 1st M.S.A. Magazine
 5th M.S.A. Magazine
 Squadron S.M.
 Asmara Airport Repair Service
 Assab Airfield Repair Service
 Bahar Dar Airfield Repair Service
 Dessie Airfield Repair Service
 Dire Dawa Airfield Repair Service
 Gimma Airfield Repair Service
 Gondar Airfield Repair Service
 Gura Airfield Repair Service
 Massaua Airfield Repair Service
 Mogadishu Airfield Repair Service

British and Commonwealth forces
Commander-in-Chief – General Archibald Wavell, Cairo

Northern front, Sudan
 Commander – Major-General William Platt
 1st Battalion Worcestershire Regiment
 1st Battalion Essex Regiment
 2nd Battalion West Yorkshire Regiment
 Six machine-gun companies of the Sudan Defence Force

Southern front, Kenya
 GOC East Africa Force – Major-General Douglas Dickinson
 Southern Brigade/1st Brigade King's African Rifles (KAR) – Brigadier Charles Christopher Fowkes
 Northern Brigade/2nd Brigade KAR Brigadier Colin Frederick Blackden
 East African Reconnaissance Regiment, later named East African Armoured Car Regiment
 22nd (Derajat) Mountain Battery (Frontier Force)

British Somaliland
 Commander – Lieutenant-Colonel Arthur Reginald Chater to 11 August 1940, Major-General Reade Godwin-Austen from 11 August to 17 August
 Somaliland Camel Corps
 1st Battalion Northern Rhodesia Regiment
 2nd (Nyasaland) Battalion King's African Rifles
 3rd Battalion 15th Punjab Regiment (from 1 July)
 1st Battalion 2nd Punjab Regiment (from 7 August)
 2nd Battalion The Black Watch (from 8 August)
 1st East African Light Battery (Four 3.7-inch howitzers)

British and Commonwealth forces, 1941
Commander-in-Chief – General Archibald Wavell

Northern front, Eritrea
Commander – Lieutenant-General William Platt
 Corps artillery and armour
 B Squadron 4th Royal Tank Regiment (RTR) (about six Matilda II infantry tanks)
 68 Medium Regiment, Royal Artillery (RA) (two batteries)
 Jammu and Kashmir Mountain Battery, Indian Army
 Battery, Sudan Horse, Sudan Defence Force
 P Battery (Anti-tank) Royal Horse Artillery (RHA)
 41 Light Anti-aircraft Battery, Royal Artillery
 Corps infantry reserve
 Two Motor Machine Gun Companies, Sudan Defence Force
 No. 51 Commando (a mixed Arab and Jewish battalion raised in the British Mandate of Palestine. Attached to 5th Indian Infantry Division for periods of the campaign.)
 4th Indian Infantry Division – Major-General Noel Beresford-Peirse
 The Central India Horse (21st King George V's Own Horse) – the Divisional reconnaissance regiment
 5th Indian Infantry Brigade, Brigadier Wilfrid Lewis Lloyd
 1st Battalion Royal Fusiliers
 3rd Battalion 1st Punjab Regiment
 4th Battalion (Outram's) 6th Rajputana Rifles
 7th Indian Infantry Brigade, Brigadier Harold Rawdon Briggs
 1st Battalion Royal Sussex Regiment (detached to Briggsforce)
 4th Battalion 16th Punjab Regiment (detached to Briggsforce)
 4th Battalion 11th Sikh Regiment (detached to Gazelle Force)
 11th Indian Infantry Brigade, Brigadier Reginald Savory
 2nd Battalion The Queen's Own Cameron Highlanders
 1st Battalion (Wellesley's) 6th Rajputana Rifles
 4th Battalion 7th Rajput Regiment (until January 1941)
 3rd Battalion 14th Punjab Regiment (from January 1941)
 2nd Battalion 5th Mahratta Light Infantry
 Gazelle Force, Colonel Frank Messervy
 1st Duke of York's Own Skinner's Horse (detached from 5th Indian Infantry Division)
 4th Battalion 11th Sikh Regiment (detached from 7 Brigade)
 3 motor machine-gun companies of the Sudan Defence Force
 390th (Sussex Yeomanry) Field Battery of 144 Field Regiment (detached from 5th Indian Infantry Division)
  Royal Artillery, Brigadier William H. B. Mirrless
 1 Field Regiment RA
 11/80 Field Battery RA
 52/98 Field Battery RA
 25 Field Regiment RA
 31 Field Regiment RA
 Engineers
 4 Field Company King George V's Own Bengal Sappers and Miners, IE
 12 Field Company Queen Victoria's Own Madras Sappers and Miners, IE
 18 Field Company Royal Bombay Sappers and Miners, IE
 11 Field Park Company Queen Victoria's Own Madras Sappers and Miners, IE
 5th Indian Infantry Division – Major-General Lewis Heath
 1st Duke of York's Own Skinner's Horse (reconnaissance regiment) (detached to Gazelle Force)
 9th Indian Infantry Brigade, Brigadier Mosley Mayne (to 1 March) Brigadier Frank Messervy (from 1 March to 13 April), Brigadier Bernard Fletcher (from 13 April)
 2nd Battalion West Yorkshire Regiment
 3rd Battalion 5th Mahratta Light Infantry
 3rd Royal battalion 12th Frontier Force Regiment
 3 motor machine-gun companies of the Sudan Defence Force
 10th Indian Infantry Brigade, Brigadier William "Bill" Slim (to 21 January), Lieutenant-Colonel Bernard Fletcher (from 21 January to 20 March), Brigadier Thomas "Pete" Rees (from 21 March)
 1st Battalion The Essex Regiment (until late November 1940)
 2nd Battalion Highland Light Infantry (from late November 1940)
 4th Battalion 10th Baluch Regiment
 3rd Battalion 18th Royal Garhwal Rifles
 29th Indian Infantry Brigade, Brigadier John Marriott
 1st Battalion the Worcestershire Regiment
 3rd Battalion 2nd Punjab Regiment
 6th Royal Battalion 13th Frontier Force Rifles
 Royal Artillery, Brigadier Claude Vallentin
 4 Field Regiment RA
 28 Field Regiment RA
 144 Field Regiment RA
 Engineers
 2 Field Company King George V's Own Bengal Sappers and Miners, IE
 20 Field Company Royal Bombay Sappers and Miners, IE
 21 Field Company Royal Bombay Sappers and Miners, IE (see Premindra Singh Bhagat)
 44 Field Park Company Queen Victoria's Own Madras Sappers and Miners, IE
 Briggs Force – Brigadier Harold Rawdon Briggs
 1st Battalion Royal Sussex Regiment (detached from 7 Brigade, 4th Indian Infantry Division)
 4th Battalion 16th Punjab Regiment (detached from 7 Brigade, 4th Indian Infantry Division)
 Brigade of the East (Free French) – Colonel Ralph Monclar
  (1st Battalion of French Foreign Legion)
  3 (3rd provisional battalion of Senegalese tirailleurs)
  (3rd Company, 1st Marine Infantry Battalion)
  (1st Squadron of Moroccan Spahis)
  (1st Colonial Artillery Battalion)
 One motor machine-gun company of the Sudan Defence Force
 One Battery from 25th Field Regiment, Royal Artillery (4th Indian Infantry Division)
 7th Field Company King George V's Own Bengal Sappers and Miners, IE
 Gideon Force (in Gojjam Province, Ethiopia), Colonel Orde Wingate
 Sudan Defence Force Frontier Battalion
 2nd Ethiopian Battalion
 Mission 101 (in Gojjam Province, Ethiopia), Brigadier Daniel Sandford
 Many Operational Centres, small groups of officers and NCOs operating in enemy territory, providing training and arms to Ethiopian patriot forces loyal to Emperor Haile Selassie I and co-ordinating their operations.

Southern front, Kenya
 Commander – Lieutenant-General Alan Cunningham
 Corps troops
 1 East African Armoured Car Regiment (less two squadrons)
 1st South African Light Tank Company
 1st South African Medium Brigade (1st and 2nd Medium Batteries)
 53rd East African Light Battery
 4th Rhodesian Anti-Tank Battery
 1st South African Division – Major-General George Brink
 1st South African Infantry Brigade – Brigadier Dan Pienaar (detached to 12th African Division until 7 March, 11th African Division until 9 May, then 5th Indian Infantry Division, 10–22 May for Amba Alagi)
 1st Duke of Edinburgh's Own Rifles
 1st Royal Natal Carabineers
 1st Transvaal Scottish
 3rd South African Armoured Car Company
 4th Field Brigade (10, 11, 12 Field Batteries) South African Artillery
 1st Field Company, South African Engineers
 2nd South African Infantry Brigade – Brigadier F.L.A. Buchanan
 1st Natal Mounted Rifles
 1st Field Force Battalion
 2nd Field Force Battalion
 2nd South African Armoured Car Company
 12th Field Company, South African Engineers
 5th South African Infantry Brigade – Brigadier Bertram Armstrong
 1st South African Irish
 2nd Regiment Botha
 3rd Transvaal Scottish
 1st South African Armoured Car Company
 5th Field Company, South African Engineers
 One platoon 1/3 King's African Rifles (Machine gun platoon)
 Divisional Artillery:
 3rd Field Brigade (7, 8, 9 Field Batteries) South African Artillery
 6th Anti-aircraft Battery (one section), South African Artillery
 3rd Anti-tank Battery, South African Artillery
 11th African Division – Major-General Harry Wetherall
 21st (East African) Brigade – Brigadier Alan MacDougall Ritchie (detached to 1st South African Division from 27 February until 6 April and to 12th African Division thereafter)
 1/2 The King's African Rifles
 1st The Northern Rhodesia Regiment
 1/4 The King's African Rifles
 53rd (Gold Coast) Field Company, West African Engineers
 26th (East African) Brigade – Brigadier William Dimoline (detached as an independent brigade for the duration of the campaign)
 2/2nd Kings African Rifles
 4/4th Kings African Rifles
 3/6th Kings African Rifles
 23rd (Nigerian) Brigade – Brigadier Gerald Smallwood
 1st The Nigeria Regiment
 2nd The Nigeria Regiment
 3rd The Nigeria Regiment
 52 (Nigeria) Light Battery West African Artillery
 51 (Nigeria) Field Company, West African Engineers
 1st East African Armoured Car Regiment (C Squadron)
 One platoon 1/3 King's African Rifles (Machine gun platoon)
 Divisional Artillery
 7th Field Brigade (5, 17, 18 Field Batteries) South African Artillery
 6th Anti-aircraft Battery (one section), South African Artillery
 1st Anti-tank Battery, South African Artillery
 Engineers
 16 Field Company, South African Engineers
 12th African Division – Major-General Reade Godwin-Austen
 22nd (East African) Brigade – Brigadier Charles Christopher Fowkes until 3 March then Lieutenant-Colonel Colin Frederick Blackden (detached to 11th African Division from 23 February to 1 March and from 12 March to 26 July)
 1/1 The King's African Rifles
 1/6 The King's African Rifles
 5th The King's African Rifles
 22 Mountain Battery Indian Artillery
 54 Field Company, East African Engineers
 25th (East African) Brigade – Brigadier W. Owen  (detached to 1st South African Division until 6 April)
 2/3rd Kings African Rifles
 2/4th Kings African Rifles
 27 Mountain Battery, Indian Artillery
 Detachment Somaliland Camel Corps Armoured cars
 24th (Gold Coast) Brigade – Brigadier Collen Edward Melville Richards
 1st Gold Coast Regiment
 2nd Gold Coast Regiment
 3rd Gold Coast Regiment
 51 (Gold Coast) Light Battery West African Artillery
 52nd Gold Coast Field Company, West African Engineers
 1st East African Armoured Car Regiment (B Squadron)
 One company less one platoon 1/3 King's African Rifles (Machine gun)
 Divisional Artillery
 1st Field Battery South African Artillery
 6th Anti-aircraft Battery (one section), South African Artillery
 2nd Anti-tank Battery, South African Artillery
 Engineers
 3rd South African Field Company

British Somaliland
 Commander – Brigadier Arthur Reginald Chater
 1st battalion 2nd Punjab Regiment (until end March 1941 from Aden)
 3rd battalion 15th Punjab Regiment (from Aden)
 Somaliland Camel Corps (reforming)

See also
 East African Campaign (World War II)
 Colonial heads of Italian East Africa
 MVSN Colonial Militia
 German Motorized Company
 Zaptie
 Dubats

Notes

Citations

Sources

Further reading

External links
 British & Commonwealth Orders of Battle, East Africa
 British Military History online
 Orders of Battle.com

Order of Battle
World War II orders of battle
History of the Bengal Sappers